The 2003 Danish Figure Skating Championships was held in Herning from 10 to 13 January 2003. Skaters competed in the disciplines of men's singles and ladies' singles. Not all disciplines were held on all levels due to a lack of participants.

Senior results

Men

Ladies

External links
 results

Danish Figure Skating Championships
Danish Figure Skating Championships, 2003
Figure Skating Championships